Angel Mortal Jr. (Spanish for "Deadly Angel"), also known under his current gimmick La Parka Negra (Spanish for "The Black Reaper"), born May 19, 1992 is a Mexican luchador, which is a masked professional wrestler currently working with Lucha Libre AAA Worldwide (AAA). He made his debut for the promotion under the name Angel Mortal Jr. as one of the prospects of AAA's 2017 La Llave a la Gloria tournament. He worked in AAA under that name until late 2017, when he took over the gimmick of La Parka Negra, since the previous La Parka Negra was no longer under contract with AAA.

References 

1992 births
Living people
Masked wrestlers
Mexican male professional wrestlers
Professional wrestlers from Mexico City
Unidentified wrestlers
21st-century professional wrestlers